The  is one of the traditionally made Japanese swords (nihontō) worn by the samurai in feudal Japan.

History and use
The production of swords in Japan is divided into specific time periods:

 Jokotō (ancient swords, until around A.D. 900)
 Kotō (old swords from around 900–1596)
 Shintō (new swords 1596–1780)
 Shinshintō (newer swords 1781–1876)
 Gendaitō (modern or contemporary swords 1876–present)

Wakizashi close to the length of a katana are called ō-wakizashi and wakizashi closer to tantō length are called ko-wakizashi. Wakizashi are not necessarily just a smaller version of the katana; they could be forged differently and have a different cross section.

Wakizashi have been in use as far back as the 15th or 16th century. The wakizashi was used as a backup or auxiliary sword; it was also used for close quarters fighting, to behead a defeated opponent and sometimes to commit seppuku. The wakizashi was one of several short swords available for use by samurai including the  yoroi tōshi, and the chisa-katana. The term wakizashi did not originally specify swords of any official blade length and was an abbreviation of wakizashi no katana ("sword thrust at one's side"); the term was applied to companion swords of all sizes. 

During the Edo period, the Tokugawa shogunate required samurai to wear Katana and shorter swords in pairs. These short swords were wakizashi and tanto, and wakizashi were mainly selected. The wakizashi being worn together with the katana was the official sign that the wearer was a samurai. When worn together the pair of swords were called daishō, which translates literally as "big-little". Only samurai could wear the daishō: it represented their social power and personal honour. During this period, commoners were allowed to wear one legal-length ko-wakizashi, which made it popular for the general public to wear wakizashi. This was common when traveling because of the risk of encountering bandits. Wakizashi were worn on the left side, secured to the waist sash (Uwa-obi or himo). It was not until the Edo period in 1638 when the rulers of Japan tried to regulate the types of swords and the social groups which were allowed to wear them that the lengths of katana and wakizashi were officially set.

Kanzan Satō, in his book titled The Japanese Sword, notes that there did not seem to be any particular need for the wakizashi and suggests that the wakizashi may have become more popular than the tantō because it was more suited for indoor fighting. He mentions the custom of leaving the katana at the door of a castle or palace when entering while continuing to wear the wakizashi inside.

Gallery

See also
 Japanese sword mountings
 Ōdachi
 Kodachi
 Tachi
 Tsurugi
 Katana

References

External links

 Richard Stein's Japanese sword guide
 Wakizashi Japanese Sword 

Japanese sword types
Japanese swords
Samurai swords
Samurai weapons and equipment